Claudia Zaczkiewicz née Reidick (born July 4, 1962 in Oberhausen) is a German athlete who competed mainly in the 100 metre Hurdles.

Biography
She competed for West Germany in the 1988 Summer Olympics held in Seoul, South Korea in the 100 metre hurdles where she won the bronze medal.

References

1962 births
West German female hurdlers
Olympic bronze medalists for West Germany
Athletes (track and field) at the 1988 Summer Olympics
Olympic athletes of West Germany
Living people
Sportspeople from Oberhausen
Medalists at the 1988 Summer Olympics
Olympic bronze medalists in athletics (track and field)
Universiade medalists in athletics (track and field)
Universiade bronze medalists for West Germany
Medalists at the 1989 Summer Universiade